Steriphoma macranthum is a species of plant in the Capparaceae family. It is found in Colombia and Panama.

References

Capparaceae
Data deficient plants
Taxonomy articles created by Polbot